A lost continent is land supposedly existing during prehistory that has since disappeared.

Lost Continent or  The Lost Continent may also refer to:

 Lost Continent (1951 film)
 Lost Continent (1955 film)
 The Lost Continent (1968 film)
 Atlantis, the Lost Continent
 The Lost Continent: The Story of Atlantis, an 1899 fantasy novel by C. J. Cutcliffe Hyne
 The Lost Continent: Travels in Small-Town America, a 1989 travel book by Bill Bryson
 Beyond Thirty, a 1916 science fiction novel by Edgar Rice Burroughs, retitled The Lost Continent for editions published between 1963 and 2001
 Lost Continents, a 1954 book by L. Sprague de Camp
 The Lost Continent, an area at Islands of Adventure theme park in Orlando, Florida

See also
 The Last Continent, a novel by Terry Pratchett